The GAA/GPA Player of the Month is a Gaelic games award that recognises the best hurler each month of the All-Ireland Senior Hurling Championship. Each of the monthly award winners are selected by members of the Gaelic Players' Association from a shortlist nominated by an independent panel, made up of four former players. The awards scheme is officially known as the PwC GAA/GPA Player of the Month.

While Vodafone had sponsored the All-Stars monthly awards scheme, the Gaelic Players' Association introduced their own awards in 2006. These were sponsored by Opel. Both the All-Stars and the GPA awards merged in 2011. Mark Foley was the inaugural recipient in April 2006 for his "outstanding corner-back play" during Limerick's unbeaten run to the National Hurling League final.

Tony Kelly has been Player of the Month the most with four awards. Two players have won the award in consecutive months; John Mullane in 2009, and Ger Farragher in 2010. They, along with Patrick Horgan in 2019, are also the only players to have won two awards in a single season.

As of July 2022, the most recent recipient of the award is wing-forward Gearóid Hegarty who plays for Limerick.

Winners

Multiple winners
The below table lists those who have won on more than one occasion.

Awards won by county

As of July 2022

Awards won by club

As of July 2022

References

Player
All-Ireland Senior Hurling Championship